Eudactylina corrugata is a species of parasitic copepod found on the little skate (Leucoraja erinacea) and the thorny skate (Amblyraja radiata) that is only known from St. Andrews, New Brunswick and Woods Hole, Massachusetts.

Eudactylina corrugata is only known from females. The species was described in 1930 by Ruby Bere.

References

External links 

Siphonostomatoida
Crustaceans of the Atlantic Ocean
Crustaceans described in 1930
Animal parasites of fish
Parasitic crustaceans